Phytoecia pontica is a species of beetle in the family Cerambycidae. It was described by Ganglbauer in 1884. It is known from Jordan, Israel, Palestine, Syria, and Turkey. It feeds on Onopordum macrocephalum.

References

Phytoecia
Beetles described in 1884